Ian Henderson (born 24 January 1985) is an English professional footballer who currently plays for Rochdale. Henderson has played most of his career as a forward, but he has also been used in various midfield roles, he can operate on both sides of the pitch as a winger, and has captained his club on numerous occasions. Henderson is Rochdale's all-time leading goalscorer.

Henderson started his career with Norwich City and made almost 70 first team appearances with them before joining Northampton Town in July 2007 following a six-month loan spell at Rotherham United. He remained at Northampton Town for 18 months and then played for Luton Town and in the Turkish football league with Ankaragücü, prior to signing for Colchester United in January 2010. Henderson hit 11 goals for Colchester United in the 2010–11 campaign, including home and away winners against Rochdale, and then scored again at Spotland for Colchester in October 2011. He scored 26 times in 130 outings for United, but left the club after manager Joe Dunne oversaw a shake-up of his squad earlier in 2013. Henderson was one of the most consistent performers in Rochdale's promotion campaign, missing only one game through suspension and scoring 11 goals, including several Goal of the Season contenders.

Henderson joined Rochdale on a free transfer in February 2013 after being released by Colchester. His performances led to the offer of a two-year contract, a deal which was extended until 2016.

Henderson has played internationally for England four times at under-18 and once at under-20 level, and is also eligible to represent Scotland.

Club career

Norwich City
Born in Bury St Edmunds, Suffolk, Henderson was a product of the Norwich City youth academy. He made his debut as substitute against Coventry City at Highfield Road in a 1–1 draw on 23 October 2002. He scored his first goal for the Canaries in a 4–2 defeat at Wimbledon on 2 November 2002, and was rewarded with a three-year professional contract at the end of January 2003, ending the season with 22 appearances. Following call-ups to both England Under-18s and Scotland Under-19s, the 2003–04 season saw Henderson win a First Division championship medal as Norwich won promotion to the Premier League. In November, he scored four goals in five games, including two in a 3–1 victory over Millwall at Carrow Road – and created a number of goals for other players. He signed a new contract in the summer of 2004 but found it difficult to establish himself in the team, making only a handful of appearances in the two subsequent seasons. His Norwich career suffered a further setback as a result of injuries.

Rotherham United (loan)
On 11 January 2007, after a five-month layoff caused by a knee injury, Henderson was loaned to Rotherham United to gain match fitness and experience in a deal at the end of the 2006–07 season. Henderson scored his only goal for Rotherham in their last home game of the season, a 4–2 defeat to Cheltenham Town. He made 18 appearances for the Millers, scoring once. At the end of the season, Henderson was released by the Canaries.

Northampton Town
Henderson signed for Northampton Town on 28 June 2007. On 27 December 2008, Northampton terminated Henderson's contract with immediate effect after Henderson did not start a game for the Cobblers during the 2008–09 season and he had failed to score in 33 first-team appearances.

Luton Town
Henderson signed for Luton Town on a short-term contract on 2 January 2009, and went on to make 18 league appearances in the 2008–09 season, scoring once against Dagenham & Redbridge. He was not offered a new contract at the end of the season, and was subsequently released from Luton.

Ankaragücü
Prior to the 2009–10 season, Henderson had a trial with Turkish Süper Lig side Ankaragücü, and on 27 July 2009, after a successful trial, signed a two-year contract until summer 2011. He made his debut for the Turkish club in the first league week of the 2009–10 season, coming on as a 59th minute substitute for Abdullah Çetin, in Ankaragücü's away game to Diyarbakirspor on 8 August 2009. After just six months in Turkey, Henderson had his contract with Ankaragucu cancelled.

Colchester United
On 7 January 2010, Henderson signed for Football League One side Colchester United on a 1p 
transfer. Henderson was sent off on his debut for Colchester United against his former club Norwich City. Henderson finished the 2010–11 season as top scorer for Colchester with 10 league goals and was the only one of United's players to hit double figures, attracting interest from other clubs with his contract set to expire. However, on 10 June 2011, Henderson signed a new contract with the U's. On 31 January 2013, Henderson had his contract with Colchester cancelled by mutual consent.

Rochdale

After the cancellation of his contract with Colchester he joined Rochdale on a contract till the end of the season. In May 2013 he agreed a two-year extension at Rochdale. Henderson scored the second goal in the Rochdale shock 2–0 FA Cup victory against Leeds United on 4 January 2014. Henderson finished the 2014–15 season with 22 league goals and second highest total in the league that season.

On 23 October 2015, it was confirmed that Ian Henderson had signed a two-year contract extension at Rochdale and would be finishing his playing career at the club, citing a love for the club itself, the management, fans and his desire to settle down in the area.

Salford City
On 29 July 2020, Henderson signed for Salford City, on a two-year deal. On 12 September, he scored inside two minutes on his début against Exeter City. The following week, he scored a hat-trick in a 4–0 away win against Grismby Town, becoming the first Salford player to score a hat-trick in the Football League. His four goals saw him win the coveted EFL League Two Player of the Month award. After six goals and an assist in April 2021, Henderson was again awarded the Player of the Month award, his second of the season as well as manager Gary Bowyer winning the league's Manager of the Month award. He was released by Salford at the end of the 2021–22 season.

Return to Rochdale

Henderson returned to Rochdale ahead of the 2022–23 season on an initial one-year deal. On 8 November he became Rochdale's all-time leading goalscorer, scoring against Salford City in a 1–0 home win to surpass Reg Jenkins' long standing record of 129 goals.

International career
Henderson is eligible to play for Scotland through his Scottish father and since he had not played a UEFA/FIFA-recognised competitive match. In May 2003, he was called up to the England Under-18 squad for a tournament in Lisbon against Portugal, Sweden and Spain. Henderson played in all three games and had goals disallowed in the win over Sweden and the draw with Portugal but scored England's first in the 2–0 defeat of Spain that won England the Lisbon Trophy. Following this success, he was called up to the Scottish Under-19 side.

Personal life
Henderson is the younger brother of Tommy Henderson, who was once also on the books at Carrow Road, but died in a car accident in December 2000.

Career statistics

Honours
Norwich City
Football League First Division: 2003–04

Rochdale
League Two promotion: 2013–14

Individual
PFA Team of the Year: 2013–14 League Two
Rochdale Player of the Year: 2014–15, 2017–18, 2018–19
 EFL League Two Player of the Month: September 2020, April 2021

References

External links

1985 births
Living people
Association football forwards
Colchester United F.C. players
English footballers
England youth international footballers
Luton Town F.C. players
MKE Ankaragücü footballers
Northampton Town F.C. players
Norwich City F.C. players
Sportspeople from Bury St Edmunds
Premier League players
Rochdale A.F.C. players
Rotherham United F.C. players
Salford City F.C. players
Süper Lig players
English Football League players
English expatriate footballers
English expatriate sportspeople in Turkey
Expatriate footballers in Turkey